The Potsdam tramway network is a network of tramways forming part of the public transport system in Potsdam, the capital city of the federal state of Brandenburg, Germany.

The network is owned and operated by the public citizen company (ViP), and included in the "Berlin C" fare zone (Tarifbereich Berlin C) of the Verkehrsverbund Berlin-Brandenburg.

History
In 1908 the network was composed by 4 lines (named from A to D) and in 1949 by 5 (named from 1 to 5).

At the end of the 1950s, new streetcars models were introduced (typical during the DDR era), the Gothawagen (T57, G4-61, G4-65 and T2-62), produced in the Thuringian town of Gotha by the Gothaer Waggonfabrik.

In the 1980s, a pair of new routes were built: in 1984 through the new residential center in Babelsberg and in 1988 from Am Stern stop to the new south-eastern residential area in Drewitz. The Czech trams Tatra KT4 were introduced in 1993, and the modern Combino and Variotram in the 2000s. Some of the Tatra KT4D were given to Ploiești, a industial city in Romania.

Network

The Potsdam route network is a standard-gauge railway. It is driven by five main and two amplifier lines. It is almost continuously double tracked, only the Nauener Tor is crossed by means of a gauntlet track.

The network consists, as of June 2022, of 7 lines:

The tram lines 91 to 96 operate on all days according to a uniform timetable scheme. This should give passengers better visibility. The basic scheme of the tram lines is a 20-minute-cyclic schedule. The timetable of the tram lines are coordinated at the linking points Potsdam Hauptbahnhof and Babelsberg station with the Berlin S-Bahn.

Lines 98 and 99 are amplifier lines that don´t operate at certain times. They are only a part of the timetable scheme. On Line 92, extra rides are offered throughout the route in the rush hour. As a result, lines 92 (with 2 courses) and 96 (with one course) run at 6/7/7-minute intervals, which in turn means that line 91 and 92 as well as 96 and 93 do not drive at an interval of 10 minutes.

The network is navigated with uni-directional vehicles. There are turning loops at all terminal stops. Exceptions are Glienicker Brücke, which is crossed by a triangular junction, as well as Schloss Charlottenhof and Potsdam Hauptbahnhof, where the tramcars can be turned around by a block bypass.

Photogallery

See also
Berlin Tramway
Kiewitt Ferry

References

Notes

Bibliography

External links

Stadtwerke (and Verkehrsbetrieb) Potsdam 
Potsdam Tramway (map, infos, pictures) at urbanrail.net
Tram Travels: Verkehrsbetrieb Potsdam (ViP)
Article about Potsdam Tramway at railway-technology.com
 
 

Transport in Potsdam
Potsdam
600 V DC railway electrification
Potsdam